Provincial Trunk Highway 7 (PTH 7) is a provincial primary highway located in the Canadian province of Manitoba.  It runs from the northern limit of the city of Winnipeg (where it meets with Route 90/Brookside Blvd.) north to Arborg, Manitoba where it intersects with PTH 68. The highway is twinned from Winnipeg to just north of PTH 67, an east-west route that provides access to the Town of Stonewall.

Route description

PTH 7 begins in the Rural Municipality of Rosser at the Winnipeg city limits at an intersection with Mollard Road, with the road continuing south into Winnipeg as Winnipeg Route 90 (Route 90 / Brookside Boulevard). It heads north as a 4-lane divided Highway to immediately have a cloverleaf interchange with PTH 101 (North Perimeter Highway) just shortly before crossing into the Rural Municipality of Rockwood. The highway has a short concurrency (overlap) with PR 321 as it travels along the western side of Stony Mountain before traveling just to the east of Stonewall, where it has a junction with PTH 67. PTH 7 now narrows to 2-lanes and has intersections with PR 323 and PR 236 before the hamlet of Gunton and the town of Teulon, having intersections with PR 415 and PTH 17 as it bypasses downtown along its eastern side.

PTH 7 crosses into the Rural Municipality of Armstrong at an intersection with PR 229 in the community of Komarno, and continues traveling due northward to pass through the hamlets of Fraserwood, where it has a concurrency with PR 231, Meleb, and Silver before entering the Municipality of Bifrost - Riverton. It enters the town of Arborg shortly thereafter and comes to an end at an intersection with PTH 68 just southeast of downtown, near the banks of the Icelandic River.

History
PTH 7 first appeared on the 1928 Manitoba Highway Map as a short feeder route connecting Stonewall and Winnipeg. When PTH 6 was opened to traffic in 1947, it incorporated a small portion of the original PTH 7. That same year, a second leg of PTH 7 was opened connecting Stony Mountain to Teulon.

PTH 7 was rerouted through Stony Mountain in 1951, bypassing Stonewall completely. It extended further north to the village of Komarno the following year, and to Fraserwood in 1955.

In 1956, PTH 7 was extended west of Fraserwood on to what is now PTH 17 as far as Narcisse. The highway was extended to Chatfield the following year, before reaching PTH 68 at Poplarfield in 1959. PTH 7 was extended to Fisher Branch in 1960.

In 1966, PTH 7 was reconfigured to its current northern terminus with PTH 68 at Arborg from Fraserwood, and the route between Fraserwood and Fisher Branch was redesignated as PTH 16. The original route was given its current PTH 17 designation in 1977.

Major intersections

References

External links 
Official Name and Location - Declaration of Provincial Trunk Highways Regulation - The Highways and Transportation Act - Provincial Government of Manitoba
Official Highway Map - Published and maintained by the Department of Infrastructure - Provincial Government of Manitoba (see Legend and Map#2 & 5)
Google Maps Search - Provincial Trunk Highway 7

007